Eponimous may be a misspelling of:

 Epinonimous
 Eponymous